James Alistair Grant Campbell QC, LL.B, UE (26 August 1922 – 12 March 2008) was a Progressive Conservative party member of the House of Commons of Canada. He was born in Cornwall, Ontario and became a barrister and lawyer by career.

After an unsuccessful attempt to gain a House of Commons seat at the Stormont riding in the 1957 federal election, he won the riding against incumbent Albert Lavigne in the 1958 election. After his only term, the 24th Canadian Parliament, he was defeated by Liberal candidate Lucien Lamoureux in the 1962 election. Campbell campaigned in one further election in Stormont during the 1972 election but was again unsuccessful.

Campbell died in Lancaster, Ontario aged 85.

References

External links
 
 Obituary at Munro & Morris

1922 births
2008 deaths
Lawyers in Ontario
Members of the House of Commons of Canada from Ontario
People from Cornwall, Ontario
Progressive Conservative Party of Canada MPs
United Empire Loyalists